Ketelyn Nascimento (born 12 June 1998) is a Brazilian judoka.

She won a medal at the 2021 World Judo Championships.

References

External links
 

1998 births
Living people
Brazilian female judoka
20th-century Brazilian women
21st-century Brazilian women